The Municipal Stadium in Łomża is a football and athletics stadium for the football club ŁKS 1926 in Łomża, Poland.

It is a modern football and athletics stadium with two stands with a capacity of 3,450 seats, including one covered.

The entire stadium complex includes: stands, the main ground of the stadium, a full-size training ground with artificial surface, a full-size training ground with a natural surface, changing rooms, tennis courts and all athletics facilities with a running track.

The municipal stadium in Łomża also received the IV A certificate of the Polish Athletics Association. This means that at the stadium in Łomża, it is possible to organize, for example, national meetings in all age categories, industry national championships (e.g. AZS) or central level competitions in the macro-region.

References

Łomża
Sports venues in Podlaskie Voivodeship
Sport in Łomża